Holy White Hounds is an American rock band from Des Moines, Iowa. They have released two studio albums, Sparkle Sparkle by Razor & Tie in 2016 and Say It With Your Mouth in 2018. They released two EPs in 2020, Soak the Master Sessions and Soak the Master Sessions Volume II.

Band members 
 Brenton Dean – lead vocals, lead guitar (2005–present)
 Ambrose Lupercal – bass guitar (2005–present)
 Seth Luloff – drums (2005–present)
 James Manson – guitar (2005–present)

Discography

Studio albums

Singles

References

Alternative rock groups from Iowa
American hard rock musical groups
Indie rock musical groups from Iowa
Musical groups from Des Moines, Iowa
Musical groups established in 2005